The 2010 Anambra State gubernatorial election occurred in Nigeria on February 6, 2010. The APGA nominee Peter Obi won the election, defeating Chris Ngige of the Action Congress of Nigeria.

Peter Obi emerged APGA candidate. He picked Emeka Sibeudu as his running mate. Chris Ngige was the ACN candidate. 25 candidates contested in the election.

Electoral system
The Governor of Anambra State is elected using the plurality voting system.

Primary election

APGA primary
The APGA primary election was won by Peter Obi. He picked Emeka Sibeudu as his running mate.

ACN primary
The ACN primary election was won by Chris Ngige.

Results
A total number of 25 candidates registered with the Independent National Electoral Commission to contest in the election.

The total number of registered voters in the state was 1,844,815. Total number of votes cast was 301,232, while number of valid votes was 284,547. Rejected votes were 16,685.

By local government area
Here are the results of the election by local government area for the two major parties. The total valid votes of 284,547 represents the 25 political parties that participated in the election. Green represents LGAs won by Peter Obi. Blue represents LGAs won by Chris Ngige. Yellow represents LGAs won by other candidates in the election. Charles Soludo of the People's Democratic Party won Oyi LGA polling 4,374 votes and Anambra East LGA polling 2,720 votes. Andy Uba of the Labour Party won Ayamelum LGA polling 6,301 votes. Nicholas Ukachukwu of the Hope Democratic Party won Nnewi South LGA polling 5,577 votes.

References 

Anambra State gubernatorial elections
Anambra State gubernatorial election
Anambra State gubernatorial election